Jill M. Friedman is an American lawyer. She is known for her legal work pertaining to the prisoners of Guantanamo Bay. Friedman is a member of the Washington office of Weil, Gotshal & Manges, a law firm that provided free representation for five Saudis detained at Guantanamo Bay. 
Friedman and Anant Raut wrote "The Saudi Repatriates Report," released in May 2007. The report is a statistical analysis of the cases of 24 repatriated Saudis, a group representing nearly half of the 53 Saudi nationals who had then been released from Guantanamo Bay.

Works
The Saudi Repatriates Report, March 19, 2007 (with Anant Raut)

References 

Year of birth missing (living people)
Living people
Guantanamo Bay attorneys